Aleksandar Kovačević (Serbian Cyrillic: Александар Ковачевић; born 9 January 1992) is a Serbian professional footballer who plays as a defensive midfielder for Serbian club Radnički Niš.

Honours
Red Star
Serbian SuperLiga: 2013–14

References

External links
 Profile at Srbijafudbal.
 
 

1992 births
Living people
Footballers from Belgrade
Serbian footballers
Serbian expatriate footballers
Association football midfielders
Serbia under-21 international footballers
Red Star Belgrade footballers
FK Spartak Subotica players
Lechia Gdańsk players
Śląsk Wrocław players
Ekstraklasa players
Serbian SuperLiga players
Expatriate footballers in Poland
Serbian expatriate sportspeople in Poland